The Bad and the Beautiful is a 1952 American melodrama that tells the story of a film producer who alienates everyone around him.  The film was directed by Vincente Minnelli, written by George Bradshaw and Charles Schnee, and starring Lana Turner, Kirk Douglas, Walter Pidgeon, Dick Powell, Barry Sullivan, Gloria Grahame and Gilbert Roland. The Bad and the Beautiful won five Academy Awards out of six nominations in 1952 (including Gloria Grahame winning Best Supporting Actress), a record for the most awards for a movie that was not nominated for Best Picture or for Best Director.

In 2002, the United States Library of Congress deemed the film "culturally significant" and selected it for preservation in the National Film Registry. The theme song, "The Bad and the Beautiful", penned by David Raksin, became a jazz standard and has been cited as an example of an excellent movie theme.

The Bad and the Beautiful was created by the same team that later worked on another film about the seedy film business, Two Weeks in Another Town (1962): director (Vincente Minnelli), producer (John Houseman), screenwriter (Charles Schnee), composer (David Raksin), male star (Kirk Douglas), and studio (MGM). Both films also feature performances of the song "Don't Blame Me", by Leslie Uggams in Two Weeks and by Peggy King in The Bad and the Beautiful. In one scene of Two Weeks in Another Town, the cast watches clips from The Bad and the Beautiful in a screening room, presented as a film that Douglas's character in Two Weeks, Jack Andrus, had starred in. Two Weeks is not a sequel, however, as the characters in the two stories are unrelated.

Plot
In Hollywood, director Fred Amiel, movie star Georgia Lorrison, and screenwriter James Lee Bartlow each refuse to speak by phone to Jonathan Shields in Paris. Movie producer Harry Pebbel gathers them in his office and explains that Shields has a new film idea and he wants the three of them for the project.  Shields cannot get financing on his own, but with their names attached, there would be no problem.  Pebbel asks the three to allow him to get Shields on the phone before they give their final answer.

As they await Shields' call, Pebbel assures the three that he understands why they refused to speak to Shields. Their involvement with Shields then unfolds in a series of flashbacks. Shields is the son of a notorious former studio head who had been dumped by the industry. The elder Shields was so unpopular that his son had to hire extras to attend his funeral.  Despite the ill feelings toward him because of his father, the younger Shields is determined to make it in Hollywood.

Shields partners with aspiring director Amiel, whom he meets at the funeral. Shields intentionally loses money he does not have in a poker game to film executive Pebbel so he can talk Pebbel into letting him work off the debt as a line producer. Shields and Amiel learn their respective trades making B movies for Pebbel. When one of their films becomes a hit, Amiel decides they are ready to take on a more significant project he has been nursing along, and Shields pitches it to the studio. Shields gets a $1 million budget to produce the film, but betrays Amiel by allowing someone with an established reputation to direct. The film's success allows Shields to start his own studio, and Pebbel goes to work for him. Amiel becomes an Oscar-winning director.

Shields next encounters alcoholic small-time actress Lorrison, the daughter of a famous actor Shields admired. He builds up her confidence and gives her the leading role in one of his movies over everyone else's objections. When she falls in love with him, he lets her think that he feels the same way so that she does not self-destruct and he gets the performance he needs. After the premiere makes her a star overnight, she finds him with a bit player named Lila. He tells her that he will never allow anyone to have that much control over him.  Crushed, Lorrison walks out on her contract. Rather than suing her, Shields lets her go to another studio. She becomes a top Hollywood star.

Finally, Bartlow is a contented professor at a small college who has written a bestselling book for which Shields has purchased the film rights. Shields wants Bartlow himself to write the script. Bartlow is not interested, but his shallow Southern belle wife Rosemary is, so he gives in. They go to Hollywood, where her constant distractions keep him from his work. Shields gets his suave actor friend Victor "Gaucho" Ribera to keep her occupied. Freed from interruption, Bartlow makes excellent progress on the script. Rosemary, however, runs away with Gaucho; they are killed in a plane crash. When the script is completed, Shields has the distraught Bartlow remain in Hollywood to help with the production, while Shields takes over directing duties.  A first-time director, Shields botches the job, which leads to his bankruptcy. Then Shields lets slip his part in Rosemary's involvement with Gaucho, so Bartlow walks out on him.  Bartlow goes on to write a novel based upon his wife (something Shields had encouraged him to do) and wins a Pulitzer Prize.

After each flashback, Pebbel sarcastically agrees that Shields "ruined" their lives; each of the three is now at the top of their respective professions, thanks largely to Shields. At last, Shields' call comes through and Pebbel asks the three if they will work with Shields just one more time; all three say no. As they leave, Pebbel is still talking to Shields. The three eavesdrop on an extension phone as Shields describes his new idea; they become more and more interested.

Cast
 Lana Turner as Georgia Lorrison
 Kirk Douglas as Jonathan Shields
 Walter Pidgeon as Harry Pebbel
 Dick Powell as James Lee Bartlow
 Barry Sullivan as  Fred Amiel
 Gloria Grahame as Rosemary Bartlow
 Gilbert Roland as  Victor "Gaucho" Ribera
 Leo G. Carroll as Henry Whitfield
 Vanessa Brown as Kay Amiel
 Paul Stewart as  Syd
 Sammy White as Gus
 Elaine Stewart as  Lila
 Ivan Triesault as Von Ellstein
 Lucy Knoch as blonde dancing with Gaucho (uncredited)

Production

The film was based on a 1949 magazine story "Of Good and Evil" by George Bradshaw, which was expanded into a longer version called Memorial to a Bad Man. It concerned the will and testament of a New York theatre producer who tried to explain his bad behavior to three people he had hurt: a writer, actor and director. MGM bought the film rights and originally Dan Hartman was to produce it. Hartman left for Paramount.

Dore Schary offered the project to John Houseman and was to be called Memo to a Bad Man. Houseman decided to change the milieu from New York theatre to Hollywood because he felt after All About Eve that a Hollywood setting would have more novelty.

"I liked it", said Houseman. "I said, 'I'll do it, but not as a Broadway picture.' I was sick to death of Broadway pictures. I said, 'I wouldn't know how to add anything to the stuff that's been done, but if you'll let me do it as a Hollywood picture, I'd love to make it.' "

Clark Gable was originally attached to star; then Spencer Tracy. Eventually Kirk Douglas signed to play the lead. Vincente Minnelli was to direct.

"People who read the script asked me why I wanted to do it", said Vincente Minnelli. "It was against Hollywood, etc. I told them I didn't see the man as an unregenerate heel—first because we find out he has a weakness, which makes him human, and second, because he's tough on himself as he is on everyone else, which makes him honest. That's the complex, wonderful thing about human beings—whether they're in Hollywood, in the automobile business, or in neckties."

Douglas later recalled being on set with Francis X. Bushman, who had a small part. He says Bushman told him his career faded away because "at the height of his fame, he inadvertently offended the all-powerful Louis B. Mayer by keeping him waiting a few minutes. Mayer, in turn, banned him from MGM and blackballed him in the industry. This was his first time on the lot in 25 years. Bushman's story gave me some useful insight into the ruthless, selfish character I was playing—still another tough-guy antihero. I was doing well with these roles."

An uncredited Lucy Knoch plays the blonde dancing with Gaucho; she is frequently assumed by modern audiences to be Kim Novak because of the resemblance.

Relation to real-life personalities

There has been much debate as to which real-life Hollywood legends are represented by the film's characters. At the time of the film's release, stories about its basis caused David O. Selznick—whose real life paralleled in some respects that of the "father-obsessed independent producer" Jonathan Shields—to have his lawyer view the film and determine whether it contained any libelous material. Shields is thought to be a blending of Selznick, Orson Welles and Val Lewton. Dore Schary, head of MGM at the time, said Shields was a combination of "David O. Selznick and as yet unknown David Merrick."

Lewton's Cat People is clearly the inspiration behind the early Shields–Amiel film Doom of the Cat Men.

The Georgia Lorrison character is the daughter of a "Great Profile" actor like John Barrymore (Diana Barrymore's career was in fact launched the same year as her father's death), but it can also be argued that Lorrison includes elements of Minnelli's ex-wife Judy Garland. Gilbert Roland's Gaucho may almost be seen as self-parody, as he had recently starred in a series of Cisco Kid pictures, though the character's name, Ribera, would seem to give a nod also to famed Hollywood seducer Porfirio Rubirosa. The director Henry Whitfield (Leo G. Carroll) is a "difficult" director modeled on Alfred Hitchcock, and his assistant Miss March (Kathleen Freeman) is modeled on Hitchcock's wife Alma Reville.   The other director, von Ellstein, may be modeled after Erich von Stroheim and Josef von Sternberg.  The James Lee Bartlow character may have been inspired by Paul Eliot Green, the University of North Carolina academic-turned-screenwriter of The Cabin in the Cotton. But Bartlow also resembles novelist William Faulkner, who worked on many of Hollywood’s best movies—and had an easier relationship with the industry than he did with his wife. She, like her movie counterpart, was a difficult, often-demanding ex-Southern belle.

Houseman later said, "The producer was thought to be Selznick, and of course it largely is, but—well, is Citizen Kane Hearst? Yes, it is Hearst, but also Pulitzer and a lot of other legendary people. So it was Selznick, Zanuck, and all others. Just as the foreign director could be Stroheim or Fritz Lang. When you start to work in a legendary world, you get legendary figures."

Release
The film was shot as Tribute to a Bad Man but the studio worried it would be mistaken for a western. The title was changed to The Bad and the Beautiful at the suggestion of MGM's head of publicity Howard Dietz who took it from F. Scott Fitzgerald. Houseman admitted he thought it was a "dreadful title, it's a loathsome, cheap, vulgar, title" but then when the film became successful 
"it seemed like one of the greatest titles ever thought of. It's certainly been imitated enough: any time anybody's really hard up for a title, they just take two adjectives and string them together with an "and" in between."

Reception
According to MGM records, the film earned $2,367,000 in the US and Canada and $1,006,000 elsewhere, resulting in a profit of $484,000. On Rotten Tomatoes, the film holds a rating of 79% from 48 reviews with the consensus: "Melodrama at its most confident, The Bad and the Beautiful is an ode to moviemaking that offers unblinking insight into the ugly egos that have shaped Hollywood history."

Awards and honors
At the Academy Awards, actress Gloria Grahame's performance as Rosemary Bartlow occupied only just 9 minutes and 32 seconds of screen time and was at the time the shortest performance to ever win an Academy Award, a record she held until 1977 when Beatrice Straight won Best Supporting Actress for Network and set a new record of 5 minutes and 2 seconds.

Theme song

David Raksin wrote the theme song "The Bad and the Beautiful" (originally called "Love is For the Very Young") for the film. Upon first hearing the song, Minnelli and Houseman nearly rejected it, but were convinced to keep it by Adolph Green and Betty Comden. After the film's release, the song became a hit and a jazz standard, and has been widely covered.

A number of film music experts and composers, including Stephen Sondheim, have highly praised the theme. In a Chicago Tribune article about the theme entitled "Anatomy of a Great Movie Theme", critic Michael Phillips wrote, "Its hypnotic way of combining dissonance with resolutions that never quite resolve when, or how, you expect them to, keeps a listener perpetually intrigued. The bittersweet quality proves elusive and addictive. It's perfect for the Douglas character, and for what Minnelli called the Hollywood-insider script's alternately 'affectionate and cynical' air."

Home media
The Bad and the Beautiful was released to DVD by Warner Home Video on February 5, 2002 as a Region 1 fullscreen DVD. It was released on Blu-ray from Warner Archive on November 19, 2019.

References

External links

 
 
 
 
 
 The Bad and the Beautiful essay by Daniel Eagan in America's Film Legacy: The Authoritative Guide to the Landmark Movies in the National Film Registry, A&C Black, 2010 , pages 42–463 

1952 films
1952 drama films
American drama films
American black-and-white films
Films about actors
Films about film directors and producers
Films about Hollywood, Los Angeles
Films set in studio lots
Films featuring a Best Supporting Actress Academy Award-winning performance
Films whose cinematographer won the Best Cinematography Academy Award
Films whose writer won the Best Adapted Screenplay Academy Award
Films whose art director won the Best Art Direction Academy Award
Films that won the Best Costume Design Academy Award
Metro-Goldwyn-Mayer films
Films directed by Vincente Minnelli
Films scored by David Raksin
United States National Film Registry films
Melodrama films
1950s English-language films
1950s American films